John Robert Louis Lee, Baron Lee of Trafford, DL (born 21 June 1942) is a British Liberal Democrat politician, who has sat as a life peer since 2006.

He was previously a Conservative Member of Parliament (MP) from 1979 to 1992.

Parliamentary career
He contested Manchester Moss Side in October 1974, but was beaten by Labour’s Frank Hatton. He was Conservative MP for Nelson and Colne from 1979 to 1983, and then for Pendle from June 1983 until he lost his seat in April 1992 to Gordon Prentice from Labour.

He served as Junior Minister for Defence Procurement from 1983 to 1986, and then for Employment from 1986 to 1989, being Minister for Tourism, from 1987 to 1989. He became a non executive director in 1999, and a member of the board of the Emerson Group.

After politics
He has been chairman of the Association of Leading Visitor Attractions, a major trade body, since 1990. He is a Deputy Lieutenant of Greater Manchester, and was High Sheriff of Greater Manchester in 1998. He was previously chairman of the Christie NHS Foundation Trust, Museum of Science and Industry in Manchester and the council of the National Youth Agency.

He was formerly a member of the English Tourist Board and vice-chairman of the North West Conciliation Committee of the Race Relations Board.

He is Patron of ShareSoc, which represents individual shareholders society in the UK.

House of Lords
He left the Conservatives in May 2001, shortly before that year's general election, and joined the Liberal Democrats. He was made a life peer as Baron Lee of Trafford of Bowdon in the County of Cheshire on 26 May 2006. From 2007 to 2012, he served as a Whip for the Liberal Democrats in the House of Lords.

He vowed to resign in February 2012 in protest at the House of Lords Reform Bill making its way into the Queen's Speech.

He released his “financial autobiography” in December 2013 – How to Make a Million – Slowly: Guiding Principles From a Lifetime Investing. He has also published his pictorial autobiography, entitled Portfolio Man, and in 2019 published a guide for young people on investing in the stock market, entitled Yummi Yoghurt, which tells the story of a fictional family company that joins the stock market.

Personal life
He currently lives in Richmond, south-west London, and is deputy chair of the Museum of Richmond.

Arms

References

Times Guide to the House of Commons, 1992

1942 births
Living people
Lee of Trafford, John Lee
Conservative Party (UK) MPs for English constituencies
UK MPs 1979–1983
UK MPs 1983–1987
UK MPs 1987–1992
People educated at William Hulme's Grammar School
Deputy Lieutenants of Greater Manchester
High Sheriffs of Greater Manchester
Life peers created by Elizabeth II